Oh, You Women! is a 1919 American silent comedy film written and directed by John Emerson and Anita Loos. The film stars Ernest Truex, Joseph Burke, Bernard Randall, Gaston Glass, Louise Huff, and Betty Wales. The film was released on May 4, 1919, by Paramount Pictures. It is currently considered a lost film.

Plot
As described in a film magazine, boy orator Abraham Lincoln Jones (Truex) works in the mayor's office and emulates his namesake, believing that he had a sure accession to the boss's chair. But the war took him away, mussed him up, and shot him back home on sick leave. He finds the home town is not the same. A couple of "Women's Rights" specialists had vested and panted the female populous, while males were minding the babies and doing housework. One young woman retained frills and furbelows, the dreaded dressmaker's daughter. Abe takes hold of the town and young woman and proves himself a man.

Cast
Ernest Truex as Abraham Lincoln Jones
Joseph Burke as Joe Bush
Bernard Randall as Alec Smart
Gaston Glass as Jimmy Johnson
Louise Huff as Mary Shelby
Betty Wales as Ethel Johnson
Merceita Esmond as Alice Wilson 
Ida Fitzhugh as Aurora Noyes
Josephine Stevens as Lotta Noyes

References

External links 

 

1919 films
1910s English-language films
Silent American comedy films
1919 comedy films
Paramount Pictures films
Films directed by John Emerson
American black-and-white films
American silent feature films
1910s American films